Scott's Addition station is a Richmond, Virginia rapid station site of the GRTC Bus Rapid Transit route.

Station layout

History 
Over the course of planning the transit line, there were several stakeholder meetings and proposals for the specific location of the project. This involved coordination with the City of Richmond, the Museum District Association, the Scott's Addition Neighborhood Association, and the VCU Master's of Urban and Regional Planning program. Conducted by VCU and the City, a transit-oriented development proposal was assembled to look at the benefits and cost benefit analysis of building a station at the corner of Broad and Cleveland Streets. There were potential plans for form-based development.

Ultimately, the station construction resulted in a new zoning designation along the corridor, known as corridor mixed-used, to allow for more density. Around the same time, the main platforms were constructed, with an eastbound platform being built at Broad and Cleveland Street, and a westbound platform being built at Broad and Altamont Street.

References

External links
 Scott's Addition station

Buildings and structures in Richmond, Virginia
GRTC Pulse stations
2018 establishments in Virginia
Bus stations in Virginia
Transport infrastructure completed in 2018